Amphitheatre Lake is a lake located on Vancouver Island  north of Circlet Lake on Forbidden Plateau, Strathcona Provincial Park.

References

Alberni Valley
Lakes of Vancouver Island
Comox Land District